Michael Carter (born March 3, 1963 in Denver) is an American racing cyclist. He still races as an amateur. He competed in the 1984 Giro d'Italia with the Gianni Motta–Linea M.D. Italia team, the first American team to compete in any of cycling's grand tours, he also rode for Xerox–Philadelphia Lasers in the 1985 Vuelta a España and Team Motorola in the 1991 Tour de France.

In 2008, he finished third in the world masters road championship, in the 45-49 age category, won by Belgian Kenny De Maerteleire.

Major results
1989
 1st Overall Cascade Cycling Classic
1991
 3rd Overall Tour de Romandie
 3rd Overall Ruta Mexico
1992
 1st Stage 4 Tour de la Willamette
1993
 3rd Overall Ruta Mexico
2001
 1st Martigny-Mauvoisin
2002
 5th Overall Tour of Qinghai Lake
2003
 2nd Overall Tour de Korea
2006
 3rd Mount Evans Hill Climb
 8th Overall Tour of Siam
2007
 3rd Mount Evans Hill Climb

References

External links
 USA Cycling Profile
 

1963 births
Living people
American male cyclists
Sportspeople from Denver
Cyclists from Colorado